A geodetic control network (also geodetic network, reference network, control point network, or control network) is a network, often of triangles, which are measured precisely by techniques of control surveying, such as terrestrial surveying or satellite geodesy.

A geodetic control network consists of stable, identifiable points with published datum values derived from observations that tie the points together.

Classically, a control is divided into horizontal (X-Y) and vertical (Z) controls (components of the control), however with the advent of satellite navigation systems, GPS in particular, this division is becoming obsolete.

Many organizations contribute information to the geodetic control network.

The higher-order (high precision, usually millimeter-to-decimeter on a scale of continents) control points are normally defined in both space and time using global or space techniques, and are used for "lower-order" points to be tied into. The lower-order control points are normally used for engineering, construction and navigation. The scientific discipline that deals with the establishing of coordinates of points in a control network is called geomatics or surveying.

Cartography applications 

After a cartographer registers key points in a digital map to the real world coordinates of those points on the ground, the map is then said to be "in control". Having a base map and other data in geodetic control means that they will overlay correctly.

When map layers are not in control, it requires extra work to adjust them to line up, which introduces additional error.
Those real world coordinates are generally in some particular map projection, unit, and geodetic datum.

Measurement techniques

Terrestrial techniques

Triangulation 

In "classical geodesy" (up to the sixties) control networks were established by triangulation using measurements of angles and of some spare distances.  The precise orientation to the geographic north is achieved through methods of geodetic astronomy. The principal instruments used are theodolites and tacheometers, which nowadays are equipped with infrared distance measuring, data bases, communication systems and partly by satellite links.

Trilateration 

Electronic distance measurement (EDM) was introduced around 1960, when the prototype instruments became small enough to be used in the field. Instead of using only sparse and much less accurate distance measurements some control networks was established or updated by using trilateration more accurate distance measurements than was previously possible and no angle measurements.

EDM increased network accuracies up to 1:1 million (1 cm per 10 km; today at least 10 times better), and made surveying less costly.

Satellite geodesy 

The geodetic use of satellites began around the same time. By using bright satellites like Echo I, Echo II and Pageos, global networks were determined, which later provided support for the theory of plate tectonics.

Another important improvement was the introduction of radio and electronic satellites like Geos A and B (1965–70), of the Transit system (Doppler effect) 1967-1990 — which was the predecessor of GPS - and of laser techniques like Lageos (USA) or Starlette (F). Despite the use of spacecraft, small networks for cadastral and technical projects are mainly measured terrestrially, but in many cases incorporated in national and global networks by satellite geodesy.

Global navigation satellite systems (GNSS) 

Nowadays, several hundred geospatial satellites are in orbit, including a large number of remote sensing satellites and navigation systems like GPS and Glonass, which was followed by the European Galileo satellites in 2020 and China's Beidou constellation.

While these developments have made satellite-based geodetic network surveying more flexible and cost effective than its terrestrial equivalent for areas free of tree canopy or urban canyons, the continued existence of fixed point networks is still needed for administrative and legal purposes on local and regional scales. Global geodetic networks cannot be defined to be fixed, since geodynamics are continuously changing the position of all continents by 2 to 20 cm per year. Therefore, modern global networks like ETRS89 or ITRF show not only coordinates of their "fixed points", but also their annual velocities.

See also 
 Cadastre
 Maps
 ED50
 Geodetic datum
 GRS80
 History of geodesy
 Survey marker
 Triangulation station
 Trigonometry

References 

Civil engineering
Geodetic surveys
Surveying and geodesy markers